The 2013 Horizon League men's basketball tournament began on March 5, 2013, and ended with the championship game on Tuesday, March 12. 

First round games were played on the home court of the higher-seeded team. The second round and semifinals were hosted by the No. 1 seed Valparaiso, while the highest remaining seed hosted the championship game.  All Horizon League schools participated in the tournament.  Teams were seeded by their regular season record, with a tiebreaker system to seed teams with identical conference records. The top two teams received a bye to the semifinals. With the departure of Butler to the Atlantic 10, there were only three first round games.

Seeds

Schedule

Bracket

First round games at campus sites of lower-numbered seeds 
Second round and semifinals hosted by #1 Seed Valparaiso
Championship game hosted by highest remaining seed

All times listed are Eastern

Honors

Tournament MVP
Erik Buggs of Valparaiso was named the tournament MVP.

Horizon League All-Tournament Team

References

Tournament
Horizon League men's basketball tournament
Horizon League men's basketball tournament
Horizon League men's basketball tournament